Giuliano Volpe (born 1958 in Terlizzi) is an Italian academic and politician.

Life
Volpe was the rector of the University of Foggia from 1 November 2008 to 31 October 2013.

He is currently the president of the Superior Council for Cultural and Scenic Goods of the Ministry of Cultural Heritage and Activities and Tourism (MiBACT).

References
Febbraio e la democrazia feudale -  Sudcritica 22 December 2013

External links
Official site

1958 births
Living people
People from Terlizzi
Left Ecology Freedom politicians
21st-century Italian politicians